Kingsley Burutu Otuaro (born 16 April 1968) is a Nigerian politician and businessman who is the current deputy governor of Delta State. He obtained his LLB and honours in 1999 from the Bendel state University (presently Ambrose Alli University). He was called to bar in 2005. He was the special adviser to James Ibori on Community affairs.
 Served as the Commissioner representing the Ijaw ethnic nationality on the board of the Delta State Oil Producing Areas Development Commission (DESOPADEC) before the board was dissolved. On re-constitution of the DESOPADEC board, Governor Emmanuel Uduaghan re-appointed him to serve in same capacity from 2012 to 2014.

References 

1968 births
Living people
Delta State politicians
20th-century Nigerian politicians
21st-century Nigerian politicians
20th-century Nigerian businesspeople
21st-century Nigerian businesspeople